The Pawtucket Slaters were an American basketball team based in Pawtucket, Rhode Island that was a member of the American Basketball League.

Year-by-year

Basketball teams in Rhode Island
American Basketball League (1925–1955) teams